Arthur Alexander Keith Duncan (11 January 1860 – 13 February 1911) was a New Zealand cricketer. He played in two first-class matches for Wellington in 1879/80.

See also
 List of Wellington representative cricketers

References

External links
 

1860 births
1911 deaths
New Zealand cricketers
Wellington cricketers
Cricketers from Christchurch